Iriondo is a surname. Notable people with the surname include:
Antonio Iriondo (born 1953), former Spanish football player and manager
Iban Iriondo (born 1984), Spanish professional road bicycle racer
Josu Iriondo (born 1938), Spanish American prelate of the Roman Catholic Church
Rafael Iriondo (born 1919), former Spanish football player and manager
Simón de Iriondo (1836–1883), Argentine politician of the National Autonomist Party

See also
Iriondo Department, administrative subdivision of the province of Santa Fe, Argentina